RUR - Python Learning Environment (RUR-PLE) is an educational tool to help students learn the Python programming language. Made by André Roberge. RUR-PLE uses the idea behind Karel the Robot, making the learning of Python programming more interesting. A student writes a program that controls a 'robot' that moves through a city consisting of a rectangular grid of streets (left-right) and avenues (up-down). 

It is very similar to Guido van Robot (GvR), but RUR-PLE can use all  Python features (while GvR only limited subset of syntax).
RUR-PLE has 48 lessons (in main European languages and Chinese) with the code and robot environment examples to experiment with.

A second implementation of RUR-PLE, Rurple NG is in progress.

References

External links 
 RUR-PLE homepage
 RUR-PLE on sourceforge (no longer maintained)

Educational programming languages
Python (programming language)